William Christmas (24 September  1734 – 26 January 1803) was an Irish politician.  He sat in the Irish House of Commons as a Member of Parliament (MP) for Kilmallock from 1776 to 1783.

References 

1734 births
1803 deaths
Members of the Parliament of Ireland (pre-1801) for County Limerick constituencies
Irish MPs 1776–1783